Sydney William Herbert Pierrepont, 3rd Earl Manvers (12 March 1826 – 16 January 1900) was a British nobleman and politician.

Born at Holme Pierrepont, he was the second surviving son of Charles Pierrepont, 2nd Earl Manvers. Educated at Eton, Pierrepont entered Christ Church, Oxford in 1843 and received his BA in 1846. While attending there, he was commissioned a first lieutenant in the Nottinghamshire Yeomanry Cavalry (Sherwood Rangers) in 1844.

Pierrepont was styled Viscount Newark after the death of his elder brother in 1850. In 1851, he was commissioned a captain in the South Nottinghamshire Yeomanry Cavalry, and in 1852, was elected unopposed as Conservative Member of Parliament for South Nottinghamshire. He was named a deputy lieutenant of Nottinghamshire in 1854. Newark continued to sit for South Nottinghamshire until 1860, when he succeeded his father as Earl Manvers. He was appointed lieutenant-colonel commandant of his Yeomanry regiment in 1868, and honorary colonel of the regiment in 1879. He died at his country house Thoresby Park from bronchitis after  having influenza.

Family and children
He married Georgine Jane Elizabeth Fanny de Franquetot, second daughter of Gustave, Duc de Coigny in 1852. They had five children:
 Lady Emily Annora Charlotte Pierrepont (16 March 1853 – 11 May 1935), married Frederick Lygon, 6th Earl Beauchamp in 1878
 Charles William Sydney Pierrepont, 4th Earl Manvers (1854–1926)
 Hon. Evelyn Henry Pierrepont (1856–1926), married Sophia Arkwright. Their eldest son became the 6th Earl Manvers.
 Hon. Henry Sydney Pierrepont (1863–1883)
 Lady Mary Augusta Pierrepont (1865–1917), married John Peter Grant in 1899

References

External links 
 

1826 births
1900 deaths
Alumni of Christ Church, Oxford
Newark, Sydney Pierrepont, Viscount
Deputy Lieutenants of Nottinghamshire
Earls in the Peerage of the United Kingdom
People educated at Eton College
Newark, Sydney Pierrepont, Viscount
Newark, Sydney Pierrepont, Viscount
Newark, Sydney Pierrepont, Viscount
Manvers, E3
Sherwood Rangers Yeomanry officers
Sydney
South Nottinghamshire Hussars officers
People from Rushcliffe (district)